Gerda Johner (born 20 July 1944) is a Swiss former pair skater.  Competing with Rüdi Johner, she was a nine-time gold medalists at the Swiss Figure Skating Championships from 1957 to 1965.  The pair finished sixth at the 1964 Winter Olympics, and the following year, they won the silver medal at the European Figure Skating Championships and finished fourth at the World Figure Skating Championships.

Results
(pairs with Rüdi Johner)

References

External links 
 

Swiss female pair skaters
1944 births
Figure skaters at the 1964 Winter Olympics
Olympic figure skaters of Switzerland
Living people
European Figure Skating Championships medalists
Universiade gold medalists for Switzerland
Universiade medalists in figure skating
Competitors at the 1962 Winter Universiade